Indian actor Shahid Kapoor began his career as a background dancer, making uncredited appearances in the films Dil To Pagal Hai (1997) and Taal (1999). He also appeared in several music videos, including one for the singer Kumar Sanu, before making his acting debut with a lead role in Ken Ghosh's romantic comedy Ishq Vishk (2003). The film was a sleeper hit, and Kapoor's portrayal of a teenage student earned him the Filmfare Award for Best Male Debut.

Kapoor found little success in the next two years; all five of his releases, including the thriller Fida (2004) and the drama Shikhar (2005), were commercial failures. In 2006, he starred opposite Kareena Kapoor in 36 China Town and Chup Chup Ke, and played a prospective groom opposite Amrita Rao in Vivah, a commercially successful family drama from director Sooraj Barjatya. In the following year, he reunited with Kareena Kapoor in the romantic comedy Jab We Met, for which he received his first Best Actor nomination at Filmfare. Kapoor's sole film release in 2008 was opposite Vidya Balan in the romantic comedy Kismat Konnection. In 2009, Kapoor portrayed twin brothers, one with a lisp and the other with a stutter, in Vishal Bhardwaj's critically acclaimed caper thriller Kaminey. He then appeared in a series of films which performed poorly at the box-office, including Mausam (2011) and Teri Meri Kahaani (2012). The 2013 action-drama R... Rajkumar proved to be his first commercial success in four years.

In 2014, Kapoor played the title character in Bhardwaj's Haider (2014), an adaptation of William Shakespeare's tragedy Hamlet. For his performance, Kapoor won the Filmfare Award for Best Actor. In 2016, he played a rockstar addicted to drugs in Udta Punjab, a crime drama about substance abuse in the Indian state of Punjab, for which he won the Filmfare Critics Award for Best Actor. Kapoor's highest-grossing release came in 2018 with Sanjay Leela Bhansali's period drama Padmaavat, one of Indian cinema's biggest grossers, in which he portrayed the Rajput ruler Rawal Ratan Singh. The following year, he played the titular role in Kabir Singh (2019), which proved to be his biggest commercial success as the sole male lead. In addition to acting in films, Kapoor has hosted eight award ceremonies, and in 2015 he featured as a talent judge on the dance reality show Jhalak Dikhhla Jaa Reloaded.

Films

Television

Music video

See also 
 List of awards and nominations received by Shahid Kapoor

Footnotes

References

External links 
 
 Shahid Kapoor on Bollywood Hungama

Indian filmographies
Filmograhies
Male actor filmographies